"London Nights" is British Europop duo London Boys' biggest hit single, released in 1989 from their debut album, The Twelve Commandments of Dance. The single was written and produced by Ralf René Maué, and its cover artwork features photography from Andy Knight. The single peaked at  2 in the United Kingdom, No. 1 in Finland, No. 4 in Ireland, and No. 9 in Switzerland. Several formats of the single include an instrumental version of "London Nights", titled "London Days".

Track listings
7-inch single
A. "London Nights" – 4:00
B. "London Days" (the instrumental) – 3:56

UK 12-inch single
A. "London Nights" – 8:22
B. "London Days" (the instrumental) – 3:56

UK 12-inch remix single
A1. "London Nights" (London remix) – 7:33
B1. "London Nights" – 3:28
B2. "London Days" (the instrumental) – 3:56

European mini maxi-CD single
 "London Nights" (single version) – 4:00
 "Requiem" (Continental remix) – 7:40
 "London Nights" (12-inch version) – 8:10

Charts

Weekly charts

Year-end charts

Certifications

References

1989 singles
1989 songs
London Boys songs
Number-one singles in Finland
Songs written by Ralf René Maué
Teldec singles
Warner Music Group singles